Brenda Atkinson (born 1955) is an English female former track and road cyclist.

Cycling career
Atkinson is a multiple British track champion and British road race champion, winning four British National Individual Sprint Championships (1978, 1979, 1980 & 1982) and three road race titles in 1978, 1979 and 1982.

References

1955 births
British female cyclists
British track cyclists
Living people